Starowola may refer to the following places:
Starowola, Garwolin County in Masovian Voivodeship (east-central Poland)
Starowola, Wołomin County in Masovian Voivodeship (east-central Poland)
Starowola, Podlaskie Voivodeship (north-east Poland)